Ksau's Motors is a division of Surangel and Sons Company in Palau. The company is the first Toyota car dealer  in the Republic of Palau.

Ksau's Motors is planning to open a supercenter in Airai, the largest city in the second most populous state in Palau in February 2022. Ksau's Motors signed an agreement with Atkins Kroll, the Toyota distributor for Guam and Micronesia.

History
Surangel and Sons Company, the parent company of Ksau's Motors, was founded in 1980 by Surangel Whipps, Sr. who was a legislator in the House of Delegates (of Palau) for 16 years, part of that tenure serving as Speaker and is the father of the President of Palau, Surangel Whipps, Jr. Eric Ksau Whipps is the CEO of Surangel and Sons Company.

Corporate Plans

Ksau's Motors plans to initially sell the Toyota Hilux and later expand to other Toyota models. The model is cited as having reliability and is suited for road conditions in Palau.

References

Buildings and structures in Palau
Automotive industry
Companies of Palau